The 1955 Bowling Green Falcons football team was an American football team that represented Bowling Green State University in the Mid-American Conference (MAC) during the 1955 college football season. In their first season under head coach Doyt Perry, the Falcons compiled a 7–1–1 record (4–1–1 against MAC opponents), shut out five opponents, finished in second place in the MAC, and outscored all opponents by a combined total of 224 to 53. The team's only loss was by a 7–0 score against MAC champion Miami.

Bo Schembechler was an assistant coach on Perry's staff during the 1955 season. Schembechler later said, "I don't believe I can name a coach, anywhere, anytime, anyhow, who did it better than Doyt Perry."

The team's statistical leaders were Jim Bryan with 499 passing yards, Carlos Jackson with 505 rushing yards, and Jack Hecker with 556 receiving yards. Jack Hecker was the team captain. Carlos Jackson received the team's Most Valuable Player award. The team established a team record (later tied by the 1957 team) by allowing only eight touchdowns in the entire season.

Schedule

References

Bowling Green
Bowling Green Falcons football seasons
Bowling Green Falcons football